Jerónimo Vicente Vallejo Cósida (1510 – 5 April 1592) was a Spanish Renaissance painter, sculptor, goldsmith and architect.

Overview
Born in a noble family, Cósida specialized in mural paintings and altarpieces (of which he came to decorate over twenty five, although most are now lost). He was active in the province of Zaragoza, and performed meticulous work, especially in the treatment of the feminine figure, and had great capacity for work dedicating nearly sixty years of his life to painting.

Style
He is credited with having introduced the style of Raphael in Spain, perhaps as a result of having trained in Valencia with Vicente Masip, as he never traveled to Italy. He also demonstrated the influences of Albrecht Dürer; especially in his drawing. A great innovator and pioneer of Renaissance painting in Aragon, together with the Italian Tomás Peliguet, his style highlights the intricacy of detail, the elegance of gestures and faces, the stylization of the canon and elaborate spatial compositions.

Works
He was artistic adviser to Hernando de Aragón, Archbishop of Zaragoza (who in turn was his main sponsor), which allowed him to work in the local Cathedral and maintain a workshop in the city. His earliest surviving work consists of some paintings and the Altarpiece of San Juan Bautista de Tarazona Cathedral, dating around the 1530s. His style evolved in the middle of the sixteenth century into a mannerism where he absorbed the lessons of masters like Raphael or inspiring Leonardo da Vinci, as shown in table Birth of St. John the Baptist altarpiece of the Charterhouse of Aula Dei, painted around 1580, one of his best works. One work executed by Cósida The Glorification of the Virgin is part of the National Inventory of Continental European Paintings collection.

References

 SERVANT MAINAR, Jesus Fermin; Concha and Oscar Dominguez Alonso Oliva Ortúzar, "Restoration of the altarpiece of the Beheading of St. John the Baptist Parish Calcena (Zaragoza)" Turiaso, No. 12, 1995, p. 279–302. ISSN 0211-7207
 MORTE Garcia, Carmen (ed.) And Margarita Castillo Montolar (coord.), The splendor of the Renaissance in Aragon, Zaragoza, Aragon Government; Museum of Fine Arts in Bilbao; Generalitat Valenciana, 2009 . Exhibition Catalogue. Brief Guide.

1510 births
1592 deaths
Spanish Renaissance painters
Spanish sculptors
Spanish male sculptors
Spanish architects